Ravi Varma Kunjikkuttan Thampuran was a Malayalam film actor, Kathakali artist and writer.

Biography 
He was born in 1936 as a member of Kochi Dynasty. He got training in Kathakali from Kerala Kalamandalam and has written a book Aalukal Arangukal, in which, the lives of Kathakali artistes are depicted.

He has acted in more than fifty films and several telefilms and serials. Some of his notable films are Mookkilla Rajyathu, Ulladakkam, God Father, Oridathu, Kalyana Raman and Ivory Merchant. He has also acted in a Hollywood film, Cotton Mary, which was directed by Ismail Merchant.

The T. V. serials in which Thampuran acted are Chitta and Samayam. He has also played pivotal roles in Shyama Prasad's Telefilm Kariyilakaattu pole, Venalinte Ozhivu and Innale Peytha Mazha. Thampuran was also seen in the central character in a documentary by Doordarshan, which created awareness among the public to keep their surroundings clean. He is a follower of CPM and had written an Attakatha `Kurukshethra ' for the sake of the party.

The veteran actor died on 24 August 2010. He was survived by his wife Sathi Varma who is the manager of Kathakali Kendram, son R. V. Vasudevan and daughter Suma Varma.

References

2010 deaths
Male actors from Kerala
Indian male film actors
1936 births
Male actors in Malayalam cinema
Kathakali exponents
Writers from Kerala
Indian male dancers
Dancers from Kerala
20th-century Indian dancers
20th-century Indian male actors